Gregory James Brown III (born September 1, 2001) is an American professional basketball player for the Ontario Clippers of the NBA G League. He played college basketball for the Texas Longhorns.

Early life and high school career
Brown grew up playing basketball under the guidance of his uncle, Roderick Anderson, a former professional basketball player. Brown attended Vandegrift High School in Austin, Texas, where he was a four-year varsity basketball starter, in addition to competing in varsity track and field in the high jump. As a freshman, he recorded his first triple-double with 15 points, 14 rebounds and a school-record 18 blocks in a win over Hutto High School. In his freshman season, Brown averaged 17.2 points, 10.7 rebounds and 3.6 blocks per game, earning All-Central Texas Newcomer of the Year honors from the Austin American-Statesman.

As a sophomore, Brown averaged 27.4 points, 12.3 rebounds, and 2.5 blocks per game en route to District 25-6A offensive most valuable player (MVP) accolades. He led the district in scoring and rebounding. In his junior season, Brown averaged 30.1 points, 13.5 rebounds and 5.4 blocks per game. He missed 14 games early in the season with a dislocated finger. Brown was named to the All-Central Texas first team for his third straight year. As a senior, he averaged 26.1 points, 13.2 rebounds and 3.5 blocks per game, collecting District 13-6A MVP, Texas Gatorade Player of the Year and Austin American-Statesman All-Central Texas Player of the Year honors. Brown led Vandegrift to a program-best 33–3 record and its first district title. He was selected to play in the McDonald's All-American Game, which was canceled due to the COVID-19 pandemic.

Recruiting
Brown drew the attention of major college basketball programs before high school. In his freshman year, he emerged as one of the best players in the 2020 class and held basketball offers from several schools, including Kansas and Texas. By the end of his high school career, Brown was a consensus five-star recruit and a top-10 player in the 2020 class, according to major recruiting services. He trimmed his offers to Auburn, Kentucky, Memphis, Michigan or Texas, or opt to instead play professionally. On April 24, 2020, he announced his commitment to Texas over Auburn, Memphis, Michigan, Kentucky and a $300,000 offer from the G League.

College career
In his college debut on November 25, 2020, Brown recorded 11 points and 10 rebounds in a 91–55 win against Texas–Rio Grande Valley. On December 20, he posted a career-high 24 points, 14 rebounds and three blocks in a 77–74 win over Oklahoma State. As a freshman, Brown averaged 9.3 points and 6.2 rebounds per game. He earned All-Big 12 honorable mention and was an All-Freshman Team and All-Newcomer Team selection. On May 13, 2021, Brown declared for the 2021 NBA draft, forgoing his remaining college eligibility.

Professional career

Portland Trail Blazers (2021–2023)
Brown was selected in the second round of the 2021 NBA draft with the 43rd pick by the New Orleans Pelicans. He was then traded to the Portland Trail Blazers for a future second-round draft pick and cash considerations. Brown joined the Trail Blazers for the 2021 NBA Summer League. On August 12, 2021, he signed a 3-year, $4.3 million rookie scale contract with the Trail Blazers. On October 23, Brown made his NBA debut, logging four points and three rebounds in a 134–105 blowout win over the Phoenix Suns. On February 8, 2022, he scored a season-high 15 points, along with eight rebounds, in a 95–113 loss to the Orlando Magic. On March 23, in a 96–133 blowout loss to the San Antonio Spurs, Brown grabbed a season-high 14 rebounds, along with seven points and two blocks.

On February 9, 2023, Brown was waived by the Blazers.

Ontario Clippers (2023–present)
On March 2, 2023, Brown was acquired by the Ontario Clippers.

Career statistics

NBA

|-
| style="text-align:left;"| 
| style="text-align:left;"| Portland
| 48 || 6 || 13.3 || .426 || .311 || .677 || 2.8 || .7 || .5 || .5 || 4.7
|-
| style="text-align:left;"| 
| style="text-align:left;"| Portland
| 16 || 0 || 5.8 || .393 || .143 || .417 || 1.2 || .2 || .3 || .3 || 1.8
|- class="sortbottom"
| style="text-align:center;" colspan="2"| Career
| 64 || 6 || 11.5 || .422 || .294 || .636 || 2.4 || .6 || .5 || .5 || 4.0

College

|-
| style="text-align:left;"| 2020–21
| style="text-align:left;"| Texas
| 26 || 24 || 20.6 || .420 || .330 || .708 || 6.2 || .4 || .6 || 1.0 || 9.3

Personal life
Brown's father, Greg Brown II, played college football as a safety for Texas before playing in the NFL Europe and the practice squad of the Denver Broncos of the National Football League. Brown's uncle, Roderick Anderson, played college basketball as a point guard for Texas before playing professionally overseas.

References

External links
Texas Longhorns bio
USA Basketball bio

2001 births
Living people
American men's basketball players
Basketball players from Austin, Texas
McDonald's High School All-Americans
New Orleans Pelicans draft picks
People from Carthage, Texas
Portland Trail Blazers players
Power forwards (basketball)
Texas Longhorns men's basketball players